Novokosino is a station on the Kalininsko-Solntsevskaya Line of the Moscow Metro. The station is situated at the northern edge of Novokosino District, adjacent to the Reutov town of Moscow Oblast. After its inauguration in 2012, it replaced Novogireyevo as the eastern terminus of Kalininskaya Line. It is the easternmost station of Moscow Metro.

External links

 Novokosino, Moscow Metro official site

Moscow Metro stations
Railway stations in Russia opened in 2012
Kalininsko-Solntsevskaya line
Reutov
Railway stations located underground in Russia